Zámutov is a village and municipality in Vranov nad Topľou District in the Prešov Region of eastern Slovakia.

History
In historical records the village was first mentioned in 1402.
Former names of the village (town): 1808, 1863–1902 Zamutó, 1907–1913 Opálhegy, 1920 – Zámutov

Geography
The municipality lies at an elevation of 250 metres and covers an area of 41.439 km². It has a population of about 2776 people.

External links
 
http://www.statistics.sk/mosmis/eng/run.html

Villages and municipalities in Vranov nad Topľou District